Free and Open source Software Developers' European Meeting (FOSDEM) is a non-commercial, volunteer-organized European event centered on free and open-source software development.  It is aimed at developers and anyone interested in the free and open-source software movement.  It aims to enable developers to meet and to promote the awareness and use of free and open-source software.

FOSDEM is held annually, usually during the first weekend of February, at the Université Libre de Bruxelles Solbosch campus in the southeast of Brussels, Belgium.

History
FOSDEM was started in 2000 under the name Open Source Developers of Europe Meeting (OSDEM) by Raphael Bauduin.  Bauduin said that since he felt he lacked the brains to properly contribute to the open-source community, he wanted to contribute by launching a European event in Brussels.  Bauduin teamed up with Damien Sandras.
The team repeated the event.  The F (of FOSDEM) was added at the request of Richard Stallman.

The event has been annually in February since then, with growing numbers of visitors, talks and tracks. It is organized thanks to the help of many volunteers.

The meeting hosted about 4,000 visitors every year by 2011.

Due to the COVID-19 pandemic, FOSDEM 2021 and 2022 were held entirely online.

Conference history

 2001 – Event named OSDEM, started by a team of five people.  Organized in two months.
 2002 – Event renamed to FOSDEM, at the request of Richard Stallman.  Attendance grew to a few thousand.
 2003
Keynotes: The History of Free Software (Jon 'Maddog' Hall), FSF (Richard Stallman)
Tracks: databases, desktop, education, multimedia, security, toolkit, tutorials
Developer rooms: embedded software, gnome developers, GNUstep, KDE, Mozilla, PostgreSQL
2004
Keynotes:  The open source paradigm shift (Tim O'Reilly), FSF (Richard Stallman)
Tracks: accessibility, Java, Linux kernel, Scripting languages, security, X&Co
Developer rooms: Debian, Java, OpenMosix, MySQL, Embedded software, KDE, Mozilla, Tcl
Tutorials, unofficial talks served as a platform for ad hoc talks.

2005
Keynotes: Wikipedia (Jimmy Wales), FSF (Richard Stallman)
Tracks: Desktop, Development tools, GRID/Clusters, Linux kernel, Packaging tools, security
Developer rooms: Calibre, Clustering, Dokeos, Embedded software, Gnome, GNU Hurd, KDE, Opengroupware, PHP/Pear, GNU Classpath, Debian, Drupal, Gentoo, GNUstep, Jabber, Mozilla, Perl, Tcl
Unofficial talks were again present.
2006
Keynotes: Richard Stallman, GPLv3 discussion
Tracks: Desktop, Development, Security, Systems, Voice over IP, Web 2.0
Developer rooms: Ada, GNU Classpath, Embedded software, Gnome, Jabber, Linux on Laptops, Opengroupware, Tcl/Tk, Calibre, Debian, Gentoo, GNUstep, KDE, Mozilla, openSUSE, X.org
2007
Keynotes: OLPC (Jim Gettys), Liberating Java (Simon Phipps)
Tracks:
main tracks: Opening/closing talks, Security, Desktop applications, Development and languages, Kernel, Web, Internet Services
side tracks: Lightning Talks, Key signing party
Developer rooms: CrossDesktop, KDE, Gnome, openSUSE, Mozilla, GNU Classpath+OpenJDK DevJam, CentOS+Fedora, Jabber, OpenGroupware+GNUstep, Python, Research Room, X.org, Gentoo, Debian, Embedded
2008
Keynotes: "Tux with Shades, Linux in Hollywood" (Robin Rowe), How a large scale opensource project works (Robert Watson), Status update of Software Patents (Pieter Hintjens)
Tracks: Opening/Closing talks, Languages, Build Systems, Games, Packaging, Virtualization, Web
Developer rooms: BSD+PostgreSQL, CentOS+Fedora, CrossDesktop, Debian, Drupal, Embedded, Free Java, GNOME, JBoss, Mozilla, OpenOffice.org, openSUSE, Research Room, Ruby on Rails, X.org
There were lightning talks about miscellaneous subjects.
2009
Keynotes: "Free. Open. Future?" (Mark Surman), Debian (Bdale Garbee), Google Summer of Code: A behind the scenes look at a large scale community (Leslie Hawthorn)
Tracks: Distributions, Languages, Security, Systems, Collaboration, Kernel
Developer rooms: Ada, BSD+PostgreSQL, CentOS+Fedora, CrossDesktop, Debian, Drupal, Embedded, Free Java, GNOME, GNUStep+Groupware, Jabber+XMPP, KDE, Mozilla, OpenOffice.org, openSUSE, Ruby on Rails, X.org
There were lightning talks about miscellaneous subjects.Various activities: Key Signing Party, Open Source Initiative special session, etc.

 2011
 Keynotes: "Why Political Liberty Depends on Software Freedom More Than Ever" (Eben Moglen), "LLVM and Clang" (Chris Lattner), "How kernel development goes wrong and why you should be a part of it anyway" (Jonathan Corbet)
 Tracks: Systems, Web browsing, Cloud, Languages, Office, Web frameworks
 Developer rooms: Crossdesktop, Data analytics, Cross distro, Embedded, Free Java, GNU, Jabber & XMPP, Mono, Mozilla, MySQL & friends, Security & hardware crypto, World of GNUstep, Accessibility, Configuration & Systems management, LibreOffice, New challenges in virtualization, Open source telephony, Perl, PostgreSQL
There were lightning talks about miscellaneous subjects.
 Various activities: PGP key signing, certification exams, beer drinking, and other social events.
 2012
 Keynotes: "Free Software: A viable model for Commercial Success" (Robert Dewar), "A new OSI for a new decade" (Simon Phipps), "Re-thinking system and distro development" (Lars Wirzenius), "Freedom, out of the box!" (Bdale Garbee)
 Tracks: Future of UI, Hypervisors, Network and IO, System, Community, Development
 Developer rooms: Ada, CrossDesktop, CrossDistribution, Embedded, Free Java, GNUstep, Hardware Cryptography, JBoss.org, Jabber and XMPP, Legal Issues, LibreOffice, Mono, Mozilla, Open Mobile Linux, PostgreSQL, Virtualization and Cloud, X.Org+OpenICC, Configuration and Systems Management, Graph Processing, Microkernel OS, MySQL and friends, Open Source Game Development, Perl, Security, Smalltalk, Telephony and Communications,
There were lightning talks'' about miscellaneous subjects.
 2013
 Keynotes: "How we made the Jenkins community" (Kohsuke Kawaguchi), "The Devil is in the Details" (Amelia Andersdotter), "The Keeper of Secrets" (Leslie Hawthorn)
 Tracks: Graphics hardware and FOSS

 2014
 Developer rooms: Ada, Automotive development, BSD, Configuration management, Desktops, Distributions, Embedded, Energy-efficient computing, Game development, Go, Graph processing, Graphics, High-performance computing and computational science, Internet of things, Java, JavaScript, Legal issues, LLVM, Microkernel and component-based operating systems, Mozilla, MySQL, NoSQL, Open document editors, Perl, PostgreSQL, Python, Smalltalk, Software-defined radio, Testing and automation, Valgrind, Virtualisation, Wikis, Wine.
2015
 Keynotes: "Identity Crisis: Are we who we say we are? (Karen Sandler), "What is wrong with Operating Systems" (Antti Kantee), "Living on Mars: A Beginner's Guide" (Ryan MacDonald).
2016
 Keynotes: "systemd and Where We Want to Take the Basic Linux Userspace in 2016" (Lennart Poettering), "Ian Murdock – In Memoriam" (Martin Michlmayr), and "Putting 8 Million People on the Map – Revolutionizing crisis response through open mapping tools" (Blake Girardot).
 DevRooms: Ada; BSD; Coding for Language Communities; Configuration Management; Containers and Process Isolation; Desktops; Distributions; EDA; Embedded, Mobile and Automotive; Free Java; GNU Guile; Geospatial; Go; Graph Processing; Graphics; high-performance computing, big data and data science; Internet of things (IoT); LLVM toolchain; Legal and Policy Issues; Lua; Microkernels; Mozilla; MySQL and Friends; Open Document Editors; Open Game Development; Open Media; Open Source Design; PHP and Friends; Perl; PostgreSQL; Python; Real Time; Ruby; SDN and NFV; Security; Software Defined Radio; Testing and Automation; Virtualisation and IaaS.

2017
Keynotes: "Kubernetes on the road to GIFEE" (Brandon Philips), "Software Heritage" (Stefano Zacchiroli, Roberto Di Cosmo), "Understanding The Complexity of Copyleft Defense" (Bradley M. Kuhn), "Using Linux in Air Traffic Control" (Gerolf Ziegenhain)
 DevRooms: BSD; Backup and Disaster Recovery; Community; Config management; Decentralised Internet; Desktops; Distributions; Electronic Design Automation (EDA); Embedded, mobile and automotive; Free Java; GNU Guile; Geospatial; Go; Graph; HPC, big data and data science; oT; LLVM toolchain; Legal and Policy Issues; Linux Containers and Microservices; Lua; Microkernels and Component-based OS, Monitoring and Cloud; Mozilla; MySQL and Friends; Open Document Editors; Open Game Development; Open Media; Open Source Design; PHP and Friends; Perl; PostgreSQL; Python; Real Time Communications; Ruby; SDN and NFV; Security; Software Defined Radio; Software Defined Storage; Testing and Automation; Valgrind; Virtualisation and IaaS.
2018
Keynotes: "Consensus as a Service" (Simon Phipps), "Next Generation Internet Initiative" (Rob van Kranenburg, Michiel Leenaars, Marietje Schaake, Georgios Tselentis), "Exploiting modern microarchitectures" (Jon Masters).
DevRooms: Ada; BSD; CAD and Open Hardware; Community; Config Management; Containers; DNS; Debugging tools; Decentralised Internet and Privacy; Distributions; Embedded, mobile and automotive; Free Java; Geospatial; Go; Graph Processing; Graphics; HPC, Big Data, and Data Science; Hardware Enablement; Identity and Access Management; Internet of Things; LLVM Toolchain; Legal and Policy Issues; Microkernels; Monitoring and Cloud; Mozilla; MySQL and Friends; Open Document Editors; Open Media; Open Source Design; Package Management; Perl Programming Languages; PostgreSQL; Real Time Communications; Retrocomputing; Rust; SDN and NFV; Software Defined Radio; Software Defined Storage; Source Code Analysis; Testing and automation; Tool the Docs; Virtualization and IaaS.
2019
Keynotes: "Can Anyone Live in Full Software Freedom Today? Confessions of Activists Who Try But Fail to Avoid Proprietary Software" (Bradley M. Kuhn, Karen Sandler), "FLOSS, the Internet and the Future" (Mitchell Baker), "Blockchain: The Ethical Considerations" (Deb Nicholson), "The Cloud is Just Another Sun" (Kyle Rankin), "2019 – Fifty years of Unix and Linux advances" (Jon 'maddog' Hall).
DevRooms: .NET and TypeScript; Ada; BSD; Blockchain and Crypto Currencies; CAD and Open Hardware; Collaborative Information and Content Management Applications; Community devroom; Containers; DNS; Decentralized Internet and Privacy; Distributions; Free Java; Free Software Radio; Free Tools and Editors; Geospatial; Go; Graph Processing; Graphics; HPC, Big Data and Data Science; Hardware Enablement; Infra Management; Javascript; LLVM; Legal and Policy Issues; ML on Code; Microkernels and Component-based OS; Minimalistic Languages; Monitoring and Observability; Mozilla; MySQL, MariaDB and Friends; Open Document Editors; Open Media; Open Source Design; PHP & Friends; PostgreSQL; Python; Quantum Computing; RISC-V; Real Time Communications (RTC); Retrocomputing; Rust; Search; Security; Software Defined Networking; Software Defined Storage; Tool the Docs; Virtualization and IaaS.
2020
Keynotes: "The Linux Kernel: We have to finish this thing one day ;) - Solving big problems in small steps for more than two decades" (Thorsten Leemhuis), "FOSSH - 2000 to 2020 and beyond! - maddog continues to pontificate" (Jon 'maddog' Hall), "FOSDEM@20 - A Celebration - The cliché of constant change" (Steven Goodwin)
DevRooms: Free Java; Software Defined Networking; DNS; Web Performance; Open Source Computer Aided Modeling and Design; Collaborative Information and Content Management Applications; Coding for Language Communities; Erlang, Elixir and Friends; Graph Processing; Ada; Open Research Tools and Technologies; Open Source Game Development; RISC-V; Retrocomputing; LLVM toolchain; X.Org/Graphics; Hardware-aided Trusted Computing; Confidential Consortium Framework; Open Source Firmware, BMC and Bootloader; Security; Quantum Computing; Legal and Policy Issues; Testing and Automation; Python; Open Document Editors; Backup and Recovery; Dependency Management; Infra Management; Containers; Embedded; JavaScript; Software Defined Storage; Virtualization and IaaS; Open Source Design; PostgreSQL; Software Defined Radio; BSD; Minimalistic Languages; Geospatial; Distributions; Rust; Debugging tools; Hardware Enablement; Microkernels and Component-based OS; Mozilla; MySQL, MariaDB and Friends; Kotlin; Decentralized Internet and Privacy; Open Media; Go; Continuous Integration and Continuous Deployment; HPC and computational science; Community Development; Free Tools and Editors; Monitoring and Observability; Real Time Communications; Internet of Things 
2021Due to the ongoing COVID-19 pandemic, this event was held online over Matrix.
2022Due to the ongoing COVID-19 pandemic, this event was held online over Matrix.

 2023
 Keynotes: "Celebrating 25 years of Open Source: Past, Present, and Future" (Nick Vidal), "Open Source Software at NASA" (Steve Crawford)
 DevRooms: BSD; Binary Tools; Collaboration and Content Management; Community; Confidential Computing; Containers; Continuous Integration and Continuous Deployment; DNS; Declarative and Minimalistic Computing; Distributions; Embedded, Mobile and Automotive; Emulator Development; Energy; Erlang, Elixir and Friends; FOSS Educational Programming Languages; FOSS on Mobile Devices; Fast and Streaming Data; Friends of OpenJDK; Go; Graph Systems and Algorithms; HPC, Big Data and Data Science; Haskell; Image-based Linux and Secure Measured Boot; JavaScript; Kernel; Kotlin; LLVM; Legal and Policy Issues; LibreOffice Technology Development Platform; MariaDB, MySQL and Friends; Matrix; Microkernel and Component-based OS; Monitoring and Observability; Mozilla; Network; Nix and NixOS; Open Media; Open Research Tools and Technology; Open Source Design; Open Source Firmware, BMC and Bootloader; PostgreSQL; Public Code and Digital Public Goods; Python; RISC-V; Railways and Open Transport; Real Time Communications; Rust; Security; Software Bill of Materials; Software Defined Storage; Sovereign Cloud; Testing and Automation; Translations; Virtualization and IaaS

FSF Award
The Free Software Foundation's ceremony for the Award for the Advancement of Free Software was held at FOSDEM from 2002 to 2006 (for the awards for 2001 to 2005).

See also

List of free-software events

References

External links

Articles containing video clips
Free-software conferences
Linux conferences
Recurring events established in 2001